Waryah Dona  is a village in Kapurthala district of Punjab State, India. The village is administrated by a Sarpanch, who is an elected representative.

Kapurthala - 0 km, Dhilwan - 17 km, Nadala - 21 km, Rayya-6 - 25 km  are the nearest taluks and Kapurthala - 2 km, Jalandhar - 21 km, Tarn Taran - 50 km and Hoshiarpur- 59 km are the nearby District Headquarters to the village.

Demography 
According to the report published by Census India in 2011, Waryah Dona has total number of 161 houses and population of 924 of which include 483 males and 441 females. Literacy rate of Waryah Dona is 73.78%, lower than state average of 75.84%.  The population of children under the age of 6 years is 85 which is 9.20% of total population of Waryah Dona, and child sex ratio is approximately 977, higher than state average of 846.

Population data

Transport 
Kapurthala - 0 km, Kartarpur - 13 km, Jalandhar - 22 km and Jalandhar Cantt. - 24 km are the nearby Cities to Waryah Dona.

Train 
Kapurthala Railway station - 7 km, Rail Coach Factory Railway station - 6 km, Khojewala Railway station - 14 km and Husainpur Railway station - 10 km are the very nearby railway stations to Waryah Dona, however Jalandhar City Railway station is major railway station is 23  km away from Waryah Dona village.

Air
Raja Sansi airport:- 73 km, Pathankot airport:- 107 km, Ludhiana airport:- 77 km and Gaggal airport:- 148 km nearest airports are available to Waryah Dona village.

Schools 
 Government Elementary School, Waryah Dona.

Colleges 
 College Of Engineering & Management, Kapurthala.
 Guru Nanak College Of Education For Women, Kapurthala.
 NSJA Government College, Kapurthala.
 CAPARO P.T.U.School Of Manufacturing And Materials Technology, Kapurthala.

Air travel connectivity 
The closest airport to the village is Sri Guru Ram Dass Jee International Airport.

Villages in Kapurthala

References

External links
  Villages in Kapurthala
 Kapurthala Villages List

Villages in Kapurthala district